The Ronis-class submarines were built for the Latvian Navy in France in 1925. They were acquired by the Soviets in 1940 following the annexation of Latvia by the Soviet Union. They were scuttled in Liepāja in June 1941 as the Germans were about to capture the port. The hulls were raised in 1942 and scrapped.

Design

The boats were small coastal submarines built to a French design. Ronis means "seal" in the Latvian language, Spīdola is a character from the Latvian language poem Lāčplēsis. The vessels of the class displaced  surfaced and  submerged. They had a complement of 27 officers and ratings.

The submarines had a maximum speed of   surfaced and   submerged. They were armed with six  torpedo tubes  with two located in the bow, and four situated in two twin external turnable mounts. The Ronis class was also armed with one  main deck gun and two  machine guns.

Ships

Service history
The two submarines were ordered in 1925 as part of the expansion of the nascent Latvian Navy which was first suggested in 1923. Constructed in France, the submarines were part of the navy's plan to guard Latvia's coastlines. With the onset of the Great Depression, the Latvian Navy comprised just the two submarines and two minesweepers acquired in the 1920s, although Latvia had planned to buy two more submarines of higher tonnage. 

In 1940 Latvia was occupied by the Soviet Union and the Latvian Navy was incorporated into the Soviet Navy's Baltic Fleet in August 1940, retaining their original names. During World War II, the Ronis-class submarines participated in operations in the Baltic Sea.

Both submarines were sent to Liepāja in 1941 where they were scheduled to overhaul in July. However, with the Germans approaching the city, the Soviets were forced to blow up and scuttle the Ronis-class submarines on 24 June 1941 to prevent their capture. Liepāja was captured on 29 June by the Germans.

Citations

References

Further reading

External links
 page on Ronis in Russian Language
 page on Spidola in Russian Language

Naval ships of Latvia
Submarine classes
Military history of Latvia
Foreign submarines of the Soviet Navy
 
France–Latvia relations